Mark Alexander Smith (born 16 December 1964) is a Scottish former footballer who played in the English Football League for Mansfield Town, Reading, Nottingham Forest, Shrewsbury Town and Stoke City. In Scotland he played for Queen's Park, Celtic, Dunfermline Athletic, Hamilton Academical and Ayr United.

Career
Smith was born in Bellshill and began his career with Queen's Park. After impressing enough he earned the chance to play for Celtic but managed just six appearances in his time at Celtic Park and left for Dunfermline Athletic. Smith spent two seasons at East End Park making 52 league appearances for the "Pars" scoring six goals. During his time with Dunfermline he spent time out on loan at Hamilton Academical and English side Stoke City. He was at Stoke for a month in the 1989–90 season and managed just two appearances for the "Potters". Nottingham Forest were seemingly impressed with Smith's performances and he joined them after his loan at Stoke ended. However, he failed to make an appearance for Forest and was instead loaned out to Third Division Reading and then Mansfield Town before signing for Shrewsbury Town. He enjoyed the best spell of his career with the "Shrews" where he spent four seasons helping the side win the Third Division title in 1993–94. He returned to Scotland to play for old club Queen's Park and after playing for Ayr United he made a third return to Queen's Park.

Career statistics

Honours
Shrewsbury Town
 Football League Third Division: 1993–94

References

Scottish footballers
Stoke City F.C. players
Celtic F.C. players
Dunfermline Athletic F.C. players
Hamilton Academical F.C. players
Reading F.C. players
Nottingham Forest F.C. players
Mansfield Town F.C. players
Shrewsbury Town F.C. players
Ayr United F.C. players
Queen's Park F.C. players
English Football League players
1964 births
Living people
Association football wingers